Becks Prime Equities, Ltd, also known as Becks Prime Restaurants, is a gourmet hamburger restaurant chain with locations in Greater Houston, Dallas and Greater Austin. As of 2010 Win Campbell is the chief executive officer. Its headquarters is located in the Energy Corridor area of Houston. The chain has fourteen locations: eight regular locations in Houston (including one in the downtown Houston tunnel system and one at the Memorial Park golf course.), one location in The Woodlands in Montgomery County, and one in Sugar Land in Fort Bend County. Becks Prime has a loyalty program called "Becks Bucks" and also offers catering services.

Its original location, which opened in 1985, is along Kirby Drive in Upper Kirby in Houston. The original location was remodeled in 2008.

In 1995 Beck's Brewery pressured Becks Prime, trying to get the chain to change the name so that "Becks" would be omitted. The beer company said that it had already claimed "Becks" as a trade name. The beer company and the restaurant chain reached an agreement; Becks Prime would only use "Becks" if it had accompanying words, such as "Prime," included.

In 2008 Becks Prime announced that it would open the "Becks Prime Sportatorium" in Memorial City Mall in the Memorial City district. The  location has a bar, a conference room, table service, and a video game room.  This location has since closed.

Reception
In the 2000s Where the Locals Eat, a national dining guide, ranked Becks Prime as one of the ten best restaurants in the United States; the publication also stated that Becks Prime served the best hamburger in Greater Houston. Becks Prime was named 2021 Best Burger in the US by Gayot.

See also

 List of hamburger restaurants

References

External links
 Becks Prime

Companies based in Houston